Combat Cars is a vehicular combat racing game developed and published by Accolade and released for the Sega Genesis in 1994.

Gameplay
In Combat Cars, the player races against other cars and can use various kinds of weapons and gadgets to damage their opponents. Each character has his/her own strengths and weaknesses (speed, car handling, etc.), as well as unique weapons. The characters and their vehicles which are equipped with weapons include a shotgun, glue spots that they can leave to slow other cars, homing missiles, mines, and others. There are 24 different tracks available in the game. The player earns money for winning or placing in races, and this money is used to calculate their score. As the player spends this money on upgrades for their vehicle, their score lowers accordingly.

The player must complete the 24 circuit tracks in multiple laps in linear fashion within a time limit if the player can reach the only checkpoint (which is the start/finish line) in a race to extend the time limit, and should the player run out of time or fail a race, the game is over. The player then must enter their name onto the scoreboard, the background being the type of environment the last race took place. After entering their name, the game resets to the SEGA introduction screen. The game also has a 2-player co-op mode.

External links

Combat Cars at GameFAQs

1994 video games
Accolade (company) games
Sega Genesis games
Sega Genesis-only games
Vehicular combat games
Video games developed in the United States
Multiplayer and single-player video games